The 1954 Women's Western Open was a golf competition held at Glen Flora Country Club in Waukegan, Illinois, which was the 25th edition of the event. Betty Jameson won the championship in match play competition by defeating Louise Suggs in the final match, 6 and 5.

References

Women's Western Open
Golf in Illinois
Waukegan, Illinois
Women's Western Open
Women's Western Open
Women's Western Open
Women's sports in Illinois